Rushy Lagoon is a rural locality in the local government area (LGA) of Dorset in the North-east LGA region of Tasmania. The 2016 census recorded a population of 30 for the state suburb of Rushy Lagoon.

History 
Rushy Lagoon was gazetted as a locality in 1968.

Geography
The waters of Ringarooma Bay, an inlet of Bass Strait, form most of the western boundary. The Ringarooma River forms the south-western boundary. The Great Musselroe River forms much of the eastern boundary.

Road infrastructure 
Route C844 (Cape Portland Road) passes through from south to north.

References

Towns in Tasmania
Localities of Dorset Council (Australia)